Sugar Hill Historic District may refer to:

Sugar Hill Historic District (Detroit)
Sugar Hill Historic District (New York City)